Gypsy is a 1993 American made-for-television biographical musical comedy-drama film directed by Emile Ardolino. The teleplay by Arthur Laurents is an adaptation of his book of the 1959 stage musical Gypsy, which was based on the 1957 autobiography Gypsy: A Memoir by Gypsy Rose Lee.

Gypsy Rose Lee's son, Erik Lee Preminger, was instrumental in getting the film in production and was the main source for research. He had tried to get the musical filmed with Bette Midler, who had always wanted to play Rose, in the principal role 10 years earlier, but it required the approval of five entities to obtain the rights. One of the obstacles had been Arthur Laurents himself, who wrote the book for the musical based on Lee's memoirs. He had hated the 1962 film version and was initially opposed to a remake. "Not for all the money in the world will we let them make another film version of Gypsy," he had said.

The film was originally broadcast by CBS on December 12, 1993, and then released in theaters in foreign markets. It has been released on home video multiple times.

Director Ardolino died of AIDS three weeks before the film was broadcast.

Plot
Determined to make her young, blonde, and beautiful daughter, June, a vaudeville headliner, willful, resourceful, domineering stage mother Rose Hovick will stop at nothing to achieve her goal. She drags June and her shy, awkward, and decidedly less-talented older sister, Louise, around the country in an effort to get them noticed, and with the assistance of agent Herbie Sommers, she manages to secure them bookings on the prestigious Orpheum Circuit.

Years pass, and the girls no longer are young enough to pull off the childlike personae their mother insists they continue to project. June rebels, and elopes with Tulsa, one of the dancers who backs the act. Devastated by what she considers an act of betrayal, Rose pours all her energies into making a success of Louise, despite the young woman's obvious lack of singing and dancing skills. Not helping matters is the increasing popularity of sound films, which leads to a decline in the demand for stage entertainment. With bookings scarce, mother and daughter find themselves in Wichita, Kansas, where the owner of a third-rate burlesque house offers Louise a job.

When one of the strippers is arrested for soliciting, Louise unwillingly becomes her replacement. At first, her voice is shaky, and her moves tentative at best, but as audiences respond to her, she begins to gain confidence in herself. She blossoms as an entertainer billed as Gypsy Rose Lee, and eventually reaches a point where she tires of her mother's constant interference in both her life and wildly successful career. Louise confronts Rose and demands she leave her alone. Finally, aware that she has spent her life enslaved by a desperate need to be noticed, an angry, bitter, and bewildered Rose stumbles onto the empty stage of the deserted theater and experiences a moment of truth that leads to an emotional breakdown followed by a reconciliation with Louise.

Cast

Musical numbers
 "Let Me Entertain You" - Baby June, Baby Louise
 "Some People" - Rose
 "Small World" - Rose and Herbie
 "Baby June and Her Newsboys" - Baby June, Baby Louise, Chorus
 "Mr. Goldstone" - Rose, Herbie, Chorus
 "Little Lamb" - Louise
 "You'll Never Get Away from Me" - Rose, Herbie
 "Dainty June and Her Farmboys" - June, Louise, Chorus
 "If Momma Was Married" - June, Louise
 "All I Need is the Girl" - Tulsa
 "Everything's Coming Up Roses" - Rose
 "Together, Wherever We Go" - Rose, Herbie, Louise
 "You Gotta Get a Gimmick" - Tessie Tura, Miss Mazeppa, Miss Electra
 "Small World" (reprise) - Rose
 "Let Me Entertain You" - Louise
 "Rose's Turn" - Rose

Soundtrack

The film features a score with music by Jule Styne and lyrics by Stephen Sondheim, and reuses the original orchestrations by Sid Ramin and Robert Ginzler. The musical numbers were choreographed by Jerome Robbins, who directed and choreographed the original Broadway production. Bob Mackie designed the costumes.

Critical reception
Jule Styne said "I'm so excited. I just watched a tape of the movie and I cried. It is the most outstanding singing and acting performance I've seen on the screen within memory."

Dorothy Rabinowitz wrote "Ms. Midler the toughest and brassiest Mama Rose ever... Most everything comes up roses here all right."

Jennifer Stevenson wrote "Probably the best movie of the television year..."

Barbara Jaeger wrote "Midler deserves both an Emmy and a Grammy."

"Midler was sensational as Mama Rose in the recent TV version of Gypsy," wrote The Buffalo News.

The Chicago Sun-Times wrote "Midler has the perfect blend of energy and maturity to portray vaudeville's ultimate stage mother. But the guiding force behind the new, sparkling Gypsy comes from the perceptive and reverent direction of Oscar winner Emile Ardolino, who artfully preserves the spirit of a stage play within the confines of television." In another article, the publication wrote "Bette Midler's star turn in CBS' Gypsy not only brought the TV musical back from the dead, but it also helped the network win another ratings season."

Nielsen ratings
The film received an 18.6/28 household rating/share, ranking 4th out of 90 programs that week, and was watched by 26.2 million viewers.

Awards and nominations

Home video
It was released on videotape and laserdisc by RHI Entertainment in 1994 and on DVD by Pioneer Entertainment in 2000 and Lionsgate Home Entertainment in 2005. In recent years, the film has also been released to several digital download and streaming outlets such as Amazon and iTunes. On March 12, 2013, after several years of unavailability, Mill Creek Entertainment reissued the film on DVD in a double-feature set with the 2001 television remake of South Pacific.

See also
 Gypsy, 1962 film

References

External links
 
  (1993)
 
  (1993)

1990s biographical films
1990s musical comedy-drama films
1993 television films
1993 films
CBS network films
American biographical films
American musical comedy-drama films
1990s French-language films
Films directed by Emile Ardolino
Films about entertainers
Films based on biographies
Films based on musicals
Films based on works by Stephen Sondheim
Films shot in Los Angeles
Films about striptease
Musical television films
Musical films based on actual events
American drama television films
1990s English-language films
1990s American films